Roberney Caballero Ariosa (born November 2, 1995) is a Cuban footballer who plays as a midfielder for Cuban club Villa Clara and the Cuba national team.

Club career
Caballero scored six goals in the 2016 season, leading Villa Clara to their 14th league title. He was named that season's Most Valuable Player by the Football Association of Cuba.

International career
Caballero represented the Cuba national under-20 team at the 2015 CONCACAF U-20 Championship, playing in all five group matches. He scored the opening goal in a 2–2 draw with Haiti. He also scored against Honduras, but the strike was ruled offside.

He made his senior international debut on 7 October 2016, during a match against the United States. In what was the first friendly between the two countries since 1947, Caballero hit the post in the second half of Cuba's 2–0 defeat.

Career statistics

International

International goals
Scores and results list Cuba's goal tally first.

Honours

Club
Villa Clara
 Campeonato Nacional: 2016

Individual
 Campeonato Nacional MVP: 2016

References

External links

 
 
 Roberney Caballero at ESPNFC
 Roberney Caballero at CaribbeanFootballDatabase

1995 births
Living people
Association football midfielders
Cuban footballers
Cuba international footballers
Cuba under-20 international footballers
FC Villa Clara players
FC Camagüey players
People from Remedios, Cuba
2019 CONCACAF Gold Cup players
2015 CONCACAF U-20 Championship players